Jezdovice is a municipality and village in Jihlava District in the Vysočina Region of the Czech Republic. It has about 200 inhabitants.

Geography
It lies in the Křižanov Highlands. The village is situated on the banks of the Třešťský Stream and on the shore of Jezdovický Pond. The territory is rich in small ponds.

History
The first written mention of Jezdovice is from 1358. Historically, the village is connected with silver mining.

Transport
Jezdovice lies on the railway line of regional importance leading from Havlíčkův Brod to Slavonice.

Sights
The two stone bridges from the 19th century in Jezdovice are technical monuments.

The Chapel of Saint Martin dates from 1870.

References

External links

Villages in Jihlava District